The Western League was the name of several American sports leagues in Minor League Baseball. This article concentrates on the Western Leagues that operated from 1900 to 1937 and from 1947 to 1958.

Its earliest progenitor, the Western League of 1885–1899, was the predecessor of the American League. Later, during the 20th century, there were four incarnations of the Western League, including the Western League of 1939–1941 (succeeding the Nebraska State League) that played at the Class D level, and an independent baseball league that operated as the Western Baseball League from 1995 to 2002.

History
The league's longest-serving franchise was located in Des Moines, Iowa, which joined the WL in 1900 and played continuously through 1937, when the league shut down during the Great Depression. Des Moines then rejoined the reborn Western circuit when Colorado Senator Edwin C. Johnson founded it in 1947; this team, a Chicago Cubs affiliate called the Des Moines Bruins, then played for the final 12 years of the league's 
existence.

Minor League baseball went unclassified through 1901. From 1902 until 1911, Class A was the highest level in the minor leagues. In 1912, a new top tier, Class AA, was created; in 1936, a second tier, Class A1, came into being. One year later, the existing Western League disbanded after it ended the 1937 season with only five teams, the Rock Island Islanders, disbanded on July 7.  Then, in 1946, the Class AA leagues were renamed AAA, and the A1 loops were renamed AA. Thus the Western League – whose clubs were actually located in the Great Plains, Rocky Mountain States, the Upper Midwest and the Upper Southwest – was a top-level minor league until 1911, then two levels below Major League Baseball through 1935, and three steps removed in 1936–37 and when it was revived in 1947 during the post-war minor league baseball boom.  For several years in the 1910s, the Western League champion played a postseason series against the champion of the Class AA American Association for supremacy of the central states.

1947-1958 
The Western League reformed in 1947 with six teams: Denver Bears, Des Moines Bruins, Lincoln A's, Omaha Cardinals, Pueblo Dodgers and Sioux City Soos. All six clubs were affiliated with major league farm systems. The WL expanded to eight teams in 1950, adding the Colorado Springs Sky Sox and Wichita Indians, but the encroachment of televised baseball and major league franchise shifts into former AAA cities hit the league hard. In 1955, the Western League's two strongest franchises, the Denver Bears and the Omaha Cardinals, were admitted to the AAA American Association.

The WL continued for four more seasons before folding in the autumn of 1958. Its last champion, the Colorado Springs Sky Sox, attracted only 61,000 fans for the season. In addition to the founding clubs and the Sky Sox, the postwar WL had teams in Albuquerque, Amarillo, Topeka, and Wichita.

List of teams

1900-1958 
Albuquerque Dukes 
Amarillo Texans ; Amarillo Gold Sox  
Bartlesville Bronchos  
Cedar Rapids Raiders  
Cheyenne Indians 
Colorado Springs Millionaires ; Colorado Springs Sky Sox  
Council Bluffs Rails  
Davenport Blue Sox  
Des Moines Hawkeyes ; Des Moines Millers ; Des Moines Midgets ; Des Moines Undertakers ; Des Moines Prohibitionists ; Des Moines Underwriters ; Des Moines Champions ; Des Moines Champs ; Des Moines Boosters ; Des Moines Demons , 
Hutchinson Wheatshockers ; Hutchinson Salt Packers , Hutchinson Wheatshockers  
Joplin Miners 
Kansas City Blues ; Kansas City Blue Stockings  
Keokuk Indians  
Lincoln Ducklings ; Lincoln Treeplanters ; Lincoln Greenbackers ; Lincoln Railsplitters ; Lincoln Greenbackers ; Lincoln Tigers ; Lincoln Links , ; *Lincoln Athletics ; Lincoln Chiefs 
Milwaukee Creams  
Minneapolis Millers  
Mitchell Kernels  
Muskogee Oilers  
Norfolk Elks ; Norfolk Yankees 
Oklahoma City Indians  
Omaha Omahogs ; Omaha Indians ; Omaha Rangers ; Omaha Rourkes ; Omaha Buffaloes ; Omaha Crickets ; Omaha Packers ; Omaha Robin Hoods ; Omaha Cardinals  
Peoria Distillers 
Pueblo Indians ; Pueblo Steelworkers ; Pueblo Braves ; Pueblo Rollers ; Pueblo Dodgers 
Rock Island Islanders ; Rock Island Rocks ; Rock Island Islanders 
St. Paul Saints  
St. Joseph Saints ; St. Joseph Drummers ; St. Joseph Saints ; St. Joseph Saints  
Sioux City Cornhuskers ; Sioux City Soos ; Sioux City Packers ; Sioux City Soos ; Sioux City Packers ; Sioux City Indians ; Sioux City Packers ; Sioux City Cowboys ;[Sioux City Soos ; Sioux City Cowboys ; Sioux City Soos  
Sioux Falls Canaries 
Springfield Cardinals  
Topeka Jayhawks ; Topeka Kaws ; Topeka Jayhawks ; Topeka Savages ; Topeka Kaw-nees ; Topeka Jayhawks ; Topeka Senators ; Topeka Hawks  
Tulsa Oilers 
Waterloo Hawks ; Waterloo Reds  
Wichita Jobbers ; Wichita Witches ; Wichita Jobbers ; (Wichita Witches ; Wichita Izzies ; Wichita Larks ; Wichita Aviators ; Wichita Oilers ; Wichita Indians 
Worthington Cardinals

1900 to 1936 standings & statistics

1900
The new Western League formed as a Class B league in 1900. Charter teams were the: Denver Grizzlies, Des Moines Hawkeyes, Omaha Omahogs, Pueblo Indians, Sioux City Cornhuskers and St. Joseph Saints.

1901
The teams in Pueblo and Sioux City folded.  New teams in Colorado Springs, Colorado, and St. Paul, Minnesota, formed and joined the League.  Teams from Kansas City, Missouri, and Minneapolis, Minnesota moved from the American League.

1902
The Minneapolis and St. Paul teams joined the American Association.  New teams in Milwaukee, Wisconsin, and Peoria, Illinois, formed and joined the League.

1903

1904
The teams in Milwaukee, Kansas City, and Peoria folded.  the Sioux City, Iowa team from the Iowa–South Dakota League joined the League.

1905
The Colorado Springs team, with a record of 22–48, moved to Pueblo, Colorado on July 15, where they had a record of 30–44.

1906
The St. Joseph team moved to the Western Association. A new team in Lincoln, Nebraska, formed and joined the League.

1907

1908

1909
Teams from Topeka, Kansas, and Wichita, Kansas, joined from the Western Association.

1910
The Pueblo team folded.  A new team in St. Joseph, Missouri, formed and joined the League.

1911
The Wichita team, with a record of 15–9, moved to Pueblo, Colorado on May 22,  Their record there was 77–66.

1912
The Pueblo team moved back to Wichita, Kansas.

Denver defeated the Minneapolis team of the American Association 4 games to 1.

1913

Milwaukee of the American Association defeated Denver 4 games to 2.

1914
Wichita Jobbers renamed Wichita Wolves.

Indianapolis of the American Association defeated Denver 4 games to 2.

1915

1916
The Wichita team, with a record of 58–84, moved to Colorado Springs, Colorado on September 10.  Their record there was 2–10.

Louisville of the American Association defeated Omaha 4 games to 1.

1917
The Topeka team folded.  A new team in Joplin, Missouri formed and joined the League.  Colorado Springs moved back to Wichita.  St. Joseph, with a record of 34–56, moved to Hutchinson, where their record was 32–24, on July 24.  Sioux City moved to St. Joseph on August 5.

Hutchinson defeated Joplin 3 games to none for the second half title.
Des Moines defeated Hutchinson 4 games to 2 for the championship.

1918
The Denver and Lincoln teams folded.  New teams in Sioux City, Iowa, and Topeka, Kansas, formed and joined the League.  Hutchinson, with a record of 14–19, moved to Oklahoma City, Oklahoma on June 2, where they compiled a record of 19–18.  Topeka, with a record of 19–13, moved to Hutchinson, Kansas, where they compiled a record of 18–18, on June 2.  The League suspended operations on July 7 due to World War I.

1919
The Hutchinson team folded.  A new team was formed in Tulsa, Oklahoma, and joined the League.

Tulsa lead St. Joseph 3 games to 1 in the championship series when the series was cancelled due to bad weather.

Wichita's Joe Wilhoit had a 69-game hitting streak, which remains the professional baseball record.

1920

1921

1922
Joplin moved to the Western Association.  A new team formed in Denver, Colorado, and joined the League.

Tulsa beat Mobile of the Southern Association 4 games to 1, with 1 tie

1923

1924
Sioux City moved to the Tri-State League.  Lincoln joined from the Nebraska State League.

1925

1926

Springfield of the Three-I League led Des Moines 3 games to 1 when the series was cancelled due to bad weather.

1927
St. Joseph moved to the Western Association.  A new team in Amarillo, Texas formed and joined.

Waco of the Texas League beat Tulsa 3 games to 2, with 1 tie.

1928
Lincoln moved to the Nebraska State League.  A new team in Pueblo, Colorado, formed and joined the League.

Tulsa beat Oklahoma City 4 games to 1, with 1 tie, for the championship.

1929
Amarillo folded.  The Topeka, Kansas team from the Western Association joined.

1930
The Tulsa team folded.  A new team formed in St. Joseph, Missouri and joined the League.

1931

Des Moines Demons beat Wichita 4 games to 2 for the championship.

1932
Topeka moved to the Western Association.  The Tulsa team joined.

Oklahoma City beat Tulsa 2 games to 1 for the second half title.
Tulsa beat Oklahoma City 4 games to none for the championship.

1933
Denver & Pueblo folded.  Oklahoma City and Tulsa moved to the Texas League.  The teams from Hutchinson, Kansas and Springfield, Missouri joined from the American Association.  New teams in Joplin, Missouri, and Topeka, Kansas, formed and joined the League.  Wichita, with a record of 6–13, moved to Muskogee on June 6, keeping the Oilers name, where they had a record of 20–82.  Hutchinson, with a record of 25–32, moved on July 7 to Bartlesville, where they had a record of 26–38.

St. Joseph beat Topeka 4 games to 1.
St. Joseph lost to the Davenport Blue Sox from the Mississippi Valley League 4 games to 2.

1934
Bartlesville, Joplin, Muskogee, and Springfield moved to the Western Association.  The teams from Davenport Blue Sox, and Rock Island Islanders joined from the Mississippi Valley League.  New teams in Cedar Rapids, Iowa, and Sioux City, Iowa formed and joined the League.

St. Joseph beat Sioux City 3 games to 1 in the first round of playoffs.  Davenport beat Des Moines by the same number.  In the championship, St. Joseph beat Davenport 4 games to 3.

1935
Topeka folded.  A new team in Keokuk, Iowa formed and joined the League.  Omaha, with a record of 22–15, moved to Council Bluffs, Iowa on June 25, where they had a record of 33–31.  Rock Island folded July 17. Council Bluffs folded August 27.

Sioux City beat Davenport 3 games to none, and St. Joseph beat Des Moines 3 games to none, in the first round of the playoffs.  St. Joseph beat Sioux City 4 games to 3 for the championship.

1936
Keokuk and St. Joseph folded.  New teams formed in Omaha, Nebraska, and Waterloo, Iowa, and joined the League.  Omaha moved to Rock Island on August 18.

1937
Rock Island folded July 7.

Cedar Rapids and Waterloo moved to the Three-I League.  Sioux City moved to the Nebraska State League.  Davenport, Des Moines, and the League itself folded.

1939 to 1941 standings & statistics

1939 Western League

Playoffs: Sioux City 3 games, Norfolk 2; Lincoln 3 games, Sioux Falls 2
Finals: Sioux City 4 games, Lincoln 2.

1940 Western League

Sioux City moved to Mitchell July 24.
The league played four quarters. Norfolk won the first, second and fourth quarters, while Sioux Falls won the third quarter.
Playoff: Sioux Falls 4 games, Norfolk 2.

1941 Western League

Playoffs: Norfolk 3 games, Sioux City 2; Pueblo 3 games, Cheyenne 1
Finals: Pueblo 3 games, Norfolk 2.

The League did not operate from 1942 - 1946. It returned in 1947 and regained its Class A Status.

1947 to 1958 standings & statistics
1947 Western League

Playoffs: Sioux City 3 games, Omaha 1; Pueblo 3 games, Des Moines 1
Finals: Pueblo 4 games, Sioux City 1.

1948 Western League

Playoffs: Lincoln 3 games, Des Moines 2; Sioux City 3 games, Denver 2. Lincoln defeated Sioux City 6-0 for third place.
Finals: Sioux City 4 games, Lincoln 2.

1949 Western League

Playoffs: Denver defeated Pueblo 5-3 for second place. Des Moines 3 games, Lincoln 1; Pueblo 3 games, Denver 1
Finals: Pueblo 4 games, Des Moines 3.

1950 Western League

Playoffs: Wichita 3 games, Omaha 0; Sioux City 3 games, Des Moines 2
Finals: Sioux City 3 games, Wichita 1.
 

1951 Western League'

Playoffs: Sioux City 3 games, Omaha 1; Denver 3 games, Wichita 1
Finals: Sioux City 3 games, Denver 1.

1952 Western League'

Playoffs: Denver 3 games, Sioux City 1; Omaha 3 games, Colorado Springs 1
Finals: Denver 3 games, Omaha 0.

1953 Western League'

Playoffs: Des Moines 3 games, Colorado Springs 1; Denver 3 games, Pueblo 0
Finals: Des Moines 3 games, Denver 1.

1954 Western League'

Playoffs: Denver 3 games, Pueblo 1; Des Moines 3 games, Omaha 1
Finals: Des Moines 3 games, Denver 1.

1955 Western League'

Playoffs: Des Moines 3 games, Colorado Springs 1; Wichita 3 games, Pueblo 2. Wichita defeated Des Moines in a one-game playoff for third place.
Finals: Wichita 3 games, Des Moines 0.

1956 Western League

Playoff: Lincoln 4 games, Amarillo 1.

1957 Western League
 No Playoffs held.  

1958 Western League

 No Playoffs held.

Media
The Western League was the topic of the book The Western League: A Baseball History, 1885 through 1999 (2002, McFarland Publishing) by W.C. Madden & Patrick J. Stewart. The .

References
Lloyd Johnson and Miles Wolff, editors. The Encyclopedia of Minor League Baseball, 1997 edition. Durham, North Carolina: Baseball America.
Sumner, Benjamin Barrett.  Minor League Baseball Standings: All North American Leagues, Through 1999.  Jefferson, N.C.:McFarland. 

1900 establishments in the United States
Defunct minor baseball leagues in the United States
Defunct professional sports leagues in the United States
Baseball leagues in New Mexico
Baseball leagues in Iowa
Baseball leagues in Nebraska
Baseball leagues in Colorado
Baseball leagues in Missouri
Baseball leagues in Kansas
Baseball leagues in Oklahoma
Baseball leagues in Texas
Baseball leagues in Wisconsin
Baseball leagues in Illinois
Baseball leagues in Minnesota
Sports leagues established in 1885
Sports leagues disestablished in 1958